The  is a breed of dog of Japanese origin that is considered rare. It was originally bred in Tosa, Shikoku (present day Kōchi), as a fighting dog and is the only breed still used (legally) in Japanese dog fighting. Ownership is restricted in some countries as a dangerous breed.

In South Korea it's one of the main dog meat breeds along with Nureongi dogs.

Appearance 
The Tosa varies considerably in size, with the Japanese-bred dogs tending to be about half the size of those bred outside the country. The coat is characterized by its short and smooth appearance and is often red, brindle or fawn, but occasionally it can be a dull black. Maintenance of the coat is usually minimal. In Japan they are considered the equivalent of Sumo wrestlers, and are even depicted in wrestling accoutrement.

History

This breed originated in the second half of the 19th century. The breed started from the native Shikoku-Inu (an indigenous dog weighing about 25 kilograms (45 pounds) and standing about 55 centimetres high). These dogs were crossed with European dog breeds, such as the Old English Bulldog in 1872, English Mastiff in 1874, Saint Bernard and German Pointer in 1876, Great Dane in 1924, and Bull Terrier. The aim was to breed a larger, more powerful dog specifically for dog fighting competitions in Japan. The heyday of Tosa breeding was between 1924 and 1933, when it was said that there were more than 5,000 Tosa breeders in Japan.

Legal matters

Ownership of Tosas is legally restricted in certain jurisdictions. In the United Kingdom ownership is regulated under the Dangerous Dogs Act 1991, and in Trinidad and Tobago under the Dog Control Act 2014. A specific exemption of a British court is required to own and import Tosas legally in the UK.

The breed is banned or legally restricted at a national level in:
 Australia
 Austria
 Denmark 
 Fiji 
 Hong Kong 
 Iceland
 Ireland
 Romania
 Malaysia
 Malta
 New Zealand
 Norway
 Singapore
 Tunisia
 United Arab Emirates
 United Kingdom
 Israel
 Turkey

See also

 Dogs portal
 List of dog breeds
 List of dog fighting breeds
 Breed-specific legislation

References

Bibliography

Further reading
 Ostuni, Steve (2003). Japanese Tosa.  Allenhurst: Kennel Club Books. .

External links

FCI breeds
Dog breeds originating in Japan
Dog fighting breeds
Rare dog breeds